Coal Island may refer to;

Coal Island, New Zealand, a small island in southwestern New Zealand
Coal Island, South Georgia, a small sub-Antarctic island close to South Georgia Island

See also
 Coalisland, town in County Tyrone, Northern Ireland